Frank Black and the Catholics: The Complete Recordings is a 7-CD box set compilation by Frank Black and the Catholics,  released by Cooking Vinyl in April 2015. Containing 132 songs, it collects all of the band's six studio albums as well as B-sides, unreleased tracks, alternate takes, the officially unreleased Sunday Sunny Mill Valley Groove Day album and the True Blue bonus disc, containing demos for the Black Letter Days album. Unusually, all tracks are listed alphabetically rather than chronologically through all seven discs. All tracks have been remastered from the original live-to-two-track and one-track recordings for this release.

Background
Talking to Songfacts in 2015 about the reason for the box set, Black said: "I suppose that as Cooking Vinyl's distributor in the US went out of business some years ago, I realized many of my records were going out of print, especially from the Catholics era. A box set is a way to revitalize a body of work, and to usher in new distribution."

Explaining the decision to present the tracks in alphabetical order rather than in their original album format, Black said in a press release: "It feels like an approximation of randomness and its a way to randomise something, especially if it's titles. We get away from the preciousness of LPs we put out and its more about the body of work, the good times that we had."

True Blue
The bonus disc True Blue features a number of "technical demos" that engineer Ben Mumphrey discovered in his New Orleans recording archive. He wrote in the set's liner notes: "These songs were recorded with the intention of being demos, to be sent to the Catholics band to learn before they traveled to Los Angeles to record the album Black Letter Days. ... We recorded in the temporarily empty "B" room in Sound City Studios in Los Angeles, where many of Mr. Black's local musician friends came by to help out. In return, exquisite evening buffets were provided for all, which Frank Black himself brought to the studio nightly and spread out. Everyone played, ate, talked, and was merry. These songs were the result."

Reception

The album received generally favorable reviews from critics. Record Collector wrote, "It’s probably foolish to conceive of Frank Black and the Catholics' body of work meriting the reverence afforded to Pixies' illustrious canon, yet the holy-rolling mass they deliver across these six, eccentrically compiled CDs is still enough to make most God-fearing rock’n’rollers believe in miracles." AllMusic wrote, "This reshuffled order just might remind fans how consistent Black's output was during this time, and how well the band's stripped-down approach suited his songwriting." AllMusic felt that the best songs of the set "serve as a reminder that Black developed into a more mature, but still playful, writer during the Catholics years."

Magnet magazine felt that as a whole, the box set "quiets the lingering misconception that after the Pixies, Black's best work was behind him." Uncut wrote that "Only those with blind faith could love everything here, but dipping in randomly produces gems." 

The Spill Magazine was positive towards the alphabetically listed track order, writing, "The randomness of the album gives it a nice variety when listening to the album by mixing it up, rather than progressing through the different phases of the band." PopMatters felt the same, writing that "this seemingly arbitrary decision actually adds an element of fascination to this box set [and] lets us consider the songs free from their original context. It makes for a new set of odd clashes." They called the bonus disc "uniformly excellent" and added, "Despite being demos, True Blue sounds like a fully formed and excellent seventh album from Frank Black and the Catholics." 

Exclaim! was less positive, writing that Black's "mystifying decision to release all of the material alphabetically (rather than chronologically) alongside the lack of extensive liner notes and the inclusion of a mostly disappointing bonus disc ... The Complete Recordings feels less celebratory than perfunctory."

Track listing
All songs written by Frank Black unless otherwise indicated.

Personnel
Adapted from the album's liner notes.

Frank Black and the Catholics
Frank Black – vocals, guitar 
Scott Boutier – drums, bells, backing vocals
Eric Drew Feldman – keyboards, synthesizer, organ, backing vocals 
Rich Gilbert – guitar, pedal steel guitar, keyboards, piano, saxophone, backing vocals 
David McCaffrey – bass, backing vocals 
David Philips – guitar, pedal steel guitar, backing vocals 
Lyle Workman – guitar

Additional musicians
Jean Black – backing vocals
Cynthia Haagens – backing vocals
Jack Kidney – saxophone, harmonica
Rob Laufer – keyboards, backing vocals
Keith Moliné – guitar
Ben Mumphrey – maracas
Van Dyke Parks – piano, accordion
Andy J. Perkins – trumpet
Eric Potter – backing vocals
Stan Ridgway – keyboards, harmonica, melodica, banjo, percussion, backing vocals
Joey Santiago – guitar
Moris Tepper – guitar, banjo, bihuela, backing vocals
Nick Vincent – percussion
Pietra Wexstun – backing vocals

Technical
Frank Black – producer, cover painting
Frank Black and the Catholics – producer
Billy Joe Bowers – engineer
Jeremy Dubs – archive work
Eric Drew Feldman – producer
Kevin Ink – engineer
Wesley James – archive work
Mark Lemhouse – design
Ben Mumphrey – producer, engineer
Stan Ridgway – producer
Dave Shiffman – engineer
Eddie Shreyer – remastering
Nick Vincent – producer

True Blue

Musicians
Frank Black – vocals, acoustic and electric guitar 
Colleen Browne – bass
Eric Drew Feldman – keyboards, drums, piano 
Brian MacLeod – drums
Justin Meldal-Johnsen – bass
Ben Mize – drums
David Philips – pedal steel guitar, electric guitar, bass, backing vocals
Eric Schermerhorn – guitar
Tommy Stinson – bass
Nick Vincent – drums
Greg Vorobiov – bass
Lyle Workman – electric guitar
Technical
 Ben Mumphrey – producer, engineer
 Recorded live to 1-track, September–November 2001, Sound City Studios, Los Angeles, California. 
 Mastered at Studio in the Country, Bogalusa, Louisiana, August 2014.

References

Frank Black and the Catholics albums
2015 compilation albums
Cooking Vinyl albums